The Ngunnawal people, also spelt Ngunawal, are an Aboriginal people of southern New South Wales and the Australian Capital Territory in Australia.

Language

Ngunnawal and Gundungurra are Australian Aboriginal languages from the Pama-Nyungan family, the traditional languages of the Ngunnawal and Gandangara peoples respectively. The two varieties are very closely related, being considered dialects of the one (unnamed) language, in the technical, linguistic sense of those terms. One classification of these varieties groups them with Ngarigo, as one of several southern tableland languages of New South Wales.

Country

When first encountered by European colonisers in the 1820s, the Ngunawal related people lived around the Yass , the great majority where the result of relationships between male convicts and settlers with Aboriginal  women.

Their tribal country according to the early ethnographer, R. H. Mathews, stated their country extended from Goulburn to Yass and Boorowa southwards as far as Lake George to the east and Goodradigbee to the west. To the south of Lake George was the county of the Nyamudy speaking a Ngarigo dialect. Recent research by Harold Koch (2011) and others shows that the Ngunnawal country was primarily the land surrounding the Yass River extending between Lake George to the east and the Murrumbidgee to the west, while the southern boundary of the Ngunnawal people was north of Canberra, approximately on a line from Gundaroo to Wee Jasper. Sometimes the whole of the Burragorang language speaking area as far north as near Young is included as Ngunnawal, giving them a population in the 1830s of well over a thousand people.

A major battle for ownership of the country was fought at Sutton between an invading Ngunnawal band and the Nyamudy inhabitants, which the latter won, establishing the Ngunnawal country, which did not extend further south along the Yass River than Gundaroo.

People
The Ngunawal people were northern neighbours of the Nyamudy/Namadgi people who lived to the south on the Limestone Plains. The Wiradjuri (to the west) and Gundungurra (to the north) peoples also bordered the Ngunnawal.

Dispute over traditional ownership
At present, three groups contest ownership in the Canberra area: the Ngambri, the Ngarigo, and the Walgalu speaking Ngambri-Guumaal, represented by Shane Mortimer, with widespread connections from across the Snowy Mountains down to the Blue Mountains.

According to settlers living in the area in the 1830s, such as quoted in the Queanbeyan Age, there were three groups in the region: the Ngunnawal, the Yass mob, the Nyamudy/Namadgi , the Limestone Plains Blacks and the Ngariga, the Manaro mob .

The present dispute originated when the Chief Minister of the Australian Capital Territory at the time, Jon Stanhope, inaccurately stated that "Ngambri is the name of one of a number of family groups that make up the Ngunnawal nation." He went on to say that "the Government recognises members of the Ngunnawal nation as descendants of the original inhabitants of this region." He made the error after talking with multiracial people of part Ngunnawal descent whose forebears had come from Yass in the 1920s to find work.

In 2012 research for the ACT Government, "Our Kin, Our Country", found "there is no basis within the description of the country supplied by Tindale. The research confirmed that the language spoken in the Canberra region was a dialect of Ngarigu, 'related to but distinguishable from the dialects spoken at Tumut and Monaro'". The report stated that evidence gathered from the mid-1700s onward was too scant to support any family's claims to be original owners.

Some Canberra-area Aboriginal people in inland southeast Australia, including Matilda House, identify as Ngambri.  Shane Mortimer defines himself as one of the Ngambri-Guumwaal, Guumwaal being a language name said to mean "high country". This claim to be a distinct nation is disputed by many other local Aboriginal people who say that the Ngambri are a small family who took their name from the Sullivan's Creek area located to the east of Black Mountain in the late 1990s.

Native title
The earliest direct evidence for Aboriginal occupation in the area comes from a rock shelter near the area of Birrigai near Tharwa, which has been dated to approximately 25,000 years ago. However, it is likely (based on older sites known from the surrounding regions) that human occupation of the region goes back considerably further.  There is no evidence what Aboriginal people lived in the area then as peoples have constantly changed their country as climate has altered significantly.

Many were gradually displaced from the Yass area beginning in the 1820s when graziers began to occupy the land there. However some people worked at properties in the region. 

Historical records of Australia record the last "full-blooded" Ngunnawal person, Nellie Hamilton, dying in 1897,

Notes

Citations

Sources

Aboriginal peoples of New South Wales
Indigenous Australians in the Australian Capital Territory
Canberra